Greatest Hits 1991-2016 ~All Singles +~ is the seventh compilation album by Japanese pop singer and songwriter Maki Ohguro. It was released on 23 November 2016 under Being Inc. label.

Background
It was released to promote Maki's resumption of music activities after six years' hiatus. It is also the first album which was released under Being since 1999, when her second compilation album Maki Ohguro Best of Best ~All Singles Collection~ was released.

This album includes all remastered singles which had been released, selected tracks from studio albums, and two new songs - Higher Higher, which was released in August 2016 as a digital single; and My will -Sekai wa Kaerarenakutemo.

The release is divided into two versions. The regular edition (with CD code JBCZ-9035/7) contains three CDs. The first press limited edition (with CD code JBCZ-9038/41) contains five CDS; the fourth CD contains coupling songs from singles which were never released before and the fifth CD is a DVD which contains Maki Ohguro 90’s Music Video Collection.

Charting performance
The album reached daily #2 and weekly #4 rank in first week. It charted for 20 weeks and sold more than 31,000 copies.

Track listing

Disc 1
All tracks arranged by Takeshi Hayama (expect track #1 and #2, by Masao Akashi)

Disc 2
All tracks arranged by Takeshi Hayama.

Disc 3

Usage in media
"Stop Motion": theme song for TV Asahi drama "Onna Jiken Kisha Tachibana Keiko"
"Chotto": opening theme for TV Asahi drama "Ichigo Hakusho"
"Kimi ni Aisareru Sono tame ni": ending theme for TV Asahi program "Houdou Maruchi Channel"
"Wakaremashou Watashi kara Kieteshimau Anata kara": theme song for TV Asahi drama "Neodrama"
"Harlem Night": opening theme for Fuji TV program "Personal Watching Jab!"
"Anata Dake Mitsumeteru": ending theme for TV Anime Slam Dunk
"Natsu ga Kuru": opening theme for Tokyo Broadcasting System Television program "Count Down TV"
"Eien no Yume ni Mukatte": opening theme for Tokyo Broadcasting System Television program "Count Down TV"
"La La La": theme song for TV Asahi drama "Aji Ichi monme"
"Koi wa Merry Go Round": theme song for TV Asahi program "CNN HEADLINE"
"Aishitemasu": theme song for Fuji TV drama "Ninshin Desu yo" (2nd season)
"Aa": theme song for TV Asahi drama "Aji Ichi monme"
"Atsukunare": broadcast theme song for NHK program "Atlanta Olympics"
"Sora": opening theme for TV anime Chūka Ichiban!
"Taiyou no Kuni he Ikou yo Sugu ni -Sora Tobu Yume ni Notte": theme song for TV Asahi drama "New Caster Kasumi Reiko"
"Yume nara Sameteyo": theme song for TV Asahi program "Kyouto Shimatsuya Jiken File"
"Yuki ga Furu mae ni": theme song for Tokyo Broadcasting System Television program "Kochira Dai San bu Shakaibu"
"Natsu ga Kuru, Soshite...": ending theme for Nihon TV program "Sport Uruguzu"
"Kochou no Yume": theme song for Fuji TV drama "Shin Kaze no Rondo"
"It's alright": ending theme for TV Asahi program "Pop! Step! Champoo!"
"Anything Goes": theme song for program Kamen Rider OOO
"My Will-Sekai wa Kaerarenakutemo-": theme song for TV Asahi drama "Kasouken no Onna"'s 16th season

References

2016 compilation albums
Being Inc. compilation albums
Japanese-language compilation albums
Maki Ohguro albums